Ticonius, also spelled Tyconius or Tychonius (active 370–390 AD) was one of the most important theologians of 4th-century North African Latin Christianity. He was a Donatist writer whose conception of the City of God influenced St. Augustine of Hippo (who wrote a book on the same topic).

Life and doctrine
He appears to have had some influence on Augustine of Hippo. He defended a milder form of Donatism than Parmenianus. He admitted a church outside his own sect and rejected the rebaptism of Catholics. Parmenianus wrote a letter against him, quoted by Augustine. Otherwise almost all we know of him is contained in Gennadius:

This gives 379–423 AD as extreme dates of his life.

Works
Ticonius's best known work, was his commentary on the Revelation, which was interpreted, somewhat like Origen, almost entirely in a spiritual sense. He asserted that the book depicts the spiritual controversy over the kingdom of God. This work is lost, but is quoted by Augustine, Primasius, Bede, and extensively in Beatus of Liébana's Commentary on the Apocalypse to be able to reconstruct its most essential parts.

To outline his general conceptions, he laid down his Seven Rules, quoted and explained by Augustine in De doctrina christiana. Augustine's authority gave them great importance for nearly a thousand years in the West.

Doctrine

Homoousios
Tyconius defended the Nicene doctrine of the homoousios, by stating:

References
 
 EarlyChurch.org.uk. "Tyconius (fl. 370 - 390)". Retrieved March 12, 2006.
 Erickson, Millard J. (1998). Christian Theology (2nd ed.) p. 1213.
 
 Tyconius. Le Livre des Regles. Introduced and translated by Jean-Marc Vercruyse. Paris: Cerf, 2004, Pp. 410 (Sources Chretiennes, 488).
 Tyconius. The Book of Rules. Trans. William S. Babcock. Atlanta: Scholars Press, 1989.
 Tyconius. "The Book of Rules, I–III." In Biblical Interpretation in the Early Church. Trans. K. Froehlich, 104–32. Philadelphia: Fortress Press, 1985.

Notes

External links
 Opera Omnia by Migne Patrologia Latina
 The Book of Rules of Tyconius, English introduction to the Latin text, 1894
 Donatism. Online Dynamic Bibliography

4th-century Christian theologians
4th-century Romans
4th-century Christians
5th-century Christians
Christian terminology
Donatists
Christian denominations established in the 4th century
4th-century Latin writers